The 2017–18 South of Scotland Football League was the 72nd season of the South of Scotland Football League, and the 4th season as the sixth tier of the Scottish football pyramid system. The season began on 29 July 2017 and ended on 7 May 2018. Reigning champions Edusport Academy were promoted to the Lowland League so did not defend their title.

The league was initially increased to a 16 team division as Bonnyton Thistle joined, and the reserve teams of Annan Athletic and Stranraer returned. However, Wigtown & Bladnoch pulled out before the season started, reducing the division to fifteen teams.

Threave Rovers won the league with a 2–0 win over closest rivals Mid-Annandale on 23 April 2018. They faced 2017–18 East of Scotland Football League champions Kelty Hearts for a place in the 2018–19 Lowland Football League, but lost 10–0 on aggregate.

Teams

The following teams have changed since the 2016–17 season.

To South of Scotland League
 Annan Athletic reserves
 Bonnyton Thistle
 Stranraer reserves

From South of Scotland League
Promoted to Lowland Football League
 Edusport Academy

 Club has an SFA Licence (as of 20 December 2017) and are eligible to participate in the Lowland League promotion play-off should they win the league.

League table

References

5
Sco